Grünbaum is a German surname meaning "green tree" and may refer to:

 Adolf Grünbaum (born 1923), German-born philosopher of science
 Branko Grünbaum (1929–2018), Croatian-born mathematician
 Fritz Grünbaum (1880–1941), Austrian cabaret artist, operetta and pop song writer
 Max Grünbaum (1817–1898), German Orientalist
 Victor Gruen (born Grünbaum; 1903–1980), an Austrian commercial architect
 Yitzhak Gruenbaum (1879–1970), Polish-Israeli leader of the Zionism

See also 
 Greenbaum

German-language surnames
Jewish surnames
Yiddish-language surnames

de:Grünbaum